David W. Spencer (1837–1920) founded the Spencer's department store chain in Victoria, British Columbia, Canada in 1873. However, before so he travelled many months over sea from Wales to Victoria so participate in the Cariboo gold rush. David was one of nine children from a long line of farmers.

After attending grammar school, Spencer completed a five-year apprenticeship at a dry goods company in Cowbridge, Wales.

Spencer died on March 2, 1920, in Victoria, British Columbia after having suffered from illness for several years.

References 

Canadian businesspeople
1837 births
1920 deaths
Welsh emigrants to Australia